Orbcomm is a family of low Earth orbit communications satellites, operated by the United States satellite communications company Orbcomm. , 51 such satellites have orbited Earth, with 50 still continuing to do so.

Satellite types

Orbcomm-CDS 

Orbcomm-CDS (Concept or Capability Demonstration Satellites) are spacecraft which were launched to test equipment and communication techniques used by the other satellites. The first three CDS satellites, Orbcomm-X, CDS-1 and CDS-2, were launched before any operational satellites, in order to validate the systems to be used in the operational constellation.

Orbcomm-X, also known as Datacomm-X, was launched in 1991. It carried communications and GPS experiments. Initially, the spacecraft was reported healthy, but communication was lost after just one orbit.

CDS-3 was launched in 2008, along with the 5 Quick Launch satellites. It contained experiments for relaying signals from the United States Coast Guard Automatic Identification System through the satellite constellation. It was designated Orbcomm FM-29, having acquired most of the communications payload from another satellite that was never launched. The avionics bus of this unlaunched satellite was later used on the TacSat-1 satellite. TacSat-1 was never launched, either.

Orbcomm-OG1

Orbcomm-1 or Orbcomm-OG1 satellites make up most of the current Orbcomm constellation. 36 were built, of which 35 were launched. The unlaunched satellite, original designation Orbcomm FM-29, was first cannibalized for parts for the CDS-3 satellite and then rebuilt as TacSat-1 for the United States military.

Orbcomm-QL

Orbcomm Quick Launch (Orbcomm-QL) satellites are satellites which were intended to replenish the constellation. The first five such satellites were launched in 2008, with one more planned, but never launched. The satellites are based on the CDS-3 satellite, which was launched on the same rocket as the first five QL spacecraft. The sixth will be launched as a secondary payload to a Russian Government satellite, also on a Kosmos-3M. Orbcomm holds options for two further satellites.
The satellites experienced a power system anomaly, and Orbcomm filed an insurance claim on the satellites for $50 million. Orbcomm reported in 2011 that the last remaining Quick Launch satellite had failed.

Orbcomm-OG2 

Orbcomm Generation 2 (Orbcomm-OG2) second-generation satellites are intended to supplement and eventually replace the current first generation constellation. Eighteen satellites were ordered by 2008 — nominally intended to be launched in three groups of six during 2010–2014 — and by 2015 have all been launched, Orbcomm three flights. Orbcomm has options for a further thirty OG2 satellites. The satellites were launched by SpaceX on the Falcon 9 launch vehicle. Originally, they were to launch on the smaller Falcon 1 launch vehicle.

The first (Orbcomm OG2-1) of these satellites was launched on 8 October 2012 as secondary payload on a SpaceX Falcon 9 v1.0 flight. The primary payload was for NASA to the International Space Station (ISS). On this launch, the Falcon 9 had a failure in one of its nine first stage engines 79 seconds after liftoff from Cape Canaveral, Florida. This prevented the OG2-1 prototype satellite from being deployed into the proper orbit. The satellite functioned as planned during the short time it was in orbit. This allowed a subset of satellite systems to be flight-test validated. The orbit of the satellite was unable to be raised to a sustainable altitude due to contractual limitations put on SpaceX by the primary payload owner, NASA. Two days after its launch the OG2-1 prototype re-entered and burned up in the atmosphere of Earth. Orbcomm claimed the mission a total loss for launch insurance purposes.

The second launch, with a constellation of six OG2 satellites, launched on 14 July 2014. The satellites were launched on a SpaceX Falcon 9 v1.1 launch vehicle. Following the end of the use of the first stage for the Orbcomm orbital mission, SpaceX used the booster stage — which would ordinarily be destroyed on reentering the Earth's atmosphere and impact with the ocean — for a flight test of a number of reusable launch vehicle technologies to safely reenter and execute a "soft vertical landing" on the ocean surface, where it successfully decelerated, made a successful reentry, landing burn and deployment of its landing legs. The first stage was not recovered as the hull integrity was breached on landing or on the subsequent "tip over and body slam".

The third launch, with the final 11 second-generation OG2 satellites, was successfully completed December 21, 2015. It was initially scheduled for late-2014, but ORBCOMM delayed the launch until at least mid-2015  finally resetting the launch timeframe to mid-August through late-September 2015. The launch date was further delayed by the rocket failure on the SpaceX Falcon 9 Flight 19 launch in June 2015, which ultimately delayed the OG2 launch further out to late 2015.

The ORBCOMM OG2 satellites are being manufactured by an industry team led by Sierra Nevada Corporation and Argon ST, a Boeing subsidiary. A total of 18 ORBCOMM next-generation OG2 satellites were in production . ORBCOMM OG2 satellites will provide enhanced ORBCOMM messaging capabilities, increased capacity, and automatic identification systems (AIS) service. The agreement with SpaceX to launch 18 satellites on its Falcon 9 rockets was signed in December 2012 for a total cost of US$42.6 million.

Launches

See also

Mobile-satellite service
Satellite phone
Globalstar
Iridium Satellite LLC
Gonets

References

Communications satellites of the United States
Communications satellite constellations
Communications satellites in low Earth orbit